Esna Boyd Robertson (née Boyd; 21 September 1899 – 13 November 1966) was an Australian tennis player who reached seven consecutive women's singles finals at the Australian Championships from 1922 through 1928. She won one of those finals, defeating Sylvia Lance Harper in 1927. Robertson participated in the first women's singles final at the Australian Championships in 1922 against fellow Australian Margaret Molesworth.

According to Wallis Myers of The Daily Telegraph and the Daily Mail, Robertson was ranked world No. 10 in 1928.

Boyd was born in Melbourne on 21 September 1899, the daughter of James Boyd, a politician, and Emma Flora McCormack. She had a sister, Alva who became a medical practitioner. She married Angus Robertson on 11 March 1929; they had a son, William, in 1930 and a daughter Mary, in 1933.

Grand Slam finals

Singles: 7 (1 title, 6 runners-up)

Doubles: 6 (4 titles, 2 runners-up)

Mixed doubles: 5 (3 titles, 2 runners-up)

Grand Slam singles tournament timeline

1Through 1923, the French Championships were open only to French nationals. The World Hard Court Championships (WHCC), actually played on clay in Paris or Brussels, began in 1912 and were open to all nationalities. The results from the 1922 and 1923 editions of that tournament are shown here. The Olympics replaced the WHCC in 1924, as the Olympics were held in Paris. Beginning in 1925, the French Championships were open to all nationalities, with the results shown here beginning with that year.

See also 
 Performance timelines for all female tennis players who reached at least one Grand Slam final

References

Australasian Championships (tennis) champions
Australian Championships (tennis) champions
Australian female tennis players
Australian people of Scottish descent
Sportswomen from Victoria (Australia)
1899 births
1966 deaths
Grand Slam (tennis) champions in women's singles
Grand Slam (tennis) champions in women's doubles
Grand Slam (tennis) champions in mixed doubles
Tennis players from Melbourne